Floyd County, Iowa has 18 county parks that are managed by the Floyd County Conservation Board. There are two wildlife management areas that are managed by the Iowa DNR, Idlewild WMA and Restoration Marsh WMA. There are also 22 parks that are managed by local municipalities.

Activities at county parks include camping, hiking, bicycling, fishing, hunting, canoeing, kayaking, horseback riding, environmental education, fossil hunting, and more.

Fishing is allowed in public locations along the Cedar River, Flood Creek, Little Cedar River, Rudd Lake, Shell Rock River and Winnebago River. A fishing license is required to fish in the state of Iowa. Check local and state regulations before fishing.

References

External links
 Floyd County Conservation Board - Floyd County, Iowa
 Parks in Floyd County - My County Parks
 Fossil & Prairie Park

Parks in Iowa
Protected areas of Floyd County, Iowa